Assodé was a town in the Aïr Mountains in what is now northern Niger.  Founded around the eleventh century, it was long the most important Tuareg town, benefiting from trans-Saharan trade, and declining with it from the eighteenth century.  It was abandoned soon after being sacked by the Tuareg forces during the Kaocen revolt of 1917, although many of its buildings are still reasonably well preserved.  It remains a tourist destination.

References

Populated places in Niger
Tuareg
Former populated places in Niger